Buccinasco is a comune (municipality) in the Metropolitan City of Milan in the Italian region Lombardy, located about  southwest of Milan.

History
The commune was created in 1841 through the merger of Buccinasco Castello, Rovido, Romano Banco and Gudo Gambaredo and, in 1871, Grancino and Ronchetto sul Naviglio (the latter annexed to Milan in 1923). It remained an agricultural center until the 1950s. Later, consistent immigration from southern Italy led Romano Banco to overcome the other hamlets in population, and it is now the main industrial and administrative part of the comune.

Main sights
The Visconti Castle (it), built in the late 14th century, and renovated in the 15th and 16th centuries.
Villa Durini-Borromeo (16th century)

References

External links
 Official website

Cities and towns in Lombardy
Castles in Italy